The Berna 2VM is a 4x4 truck model that Berna (manufacturer of buses, trolleybuses and trucks), at Olten, from 1964 to 1976 in total 1600 pieces produced. The company Berna was in 1929 purchased by Adolph Saurer AG.  T
The Swiss Army used the Berna 2VM  in several special versions, such as dump trucks, snow plow or tanker for aircraft or tanks. Almost identical was the model Saurer 2DM from the  Adolph Saurer AG in Arbon. The Berna 2VM was also sold for civilian purposes.
One is on display at the Schweizerische Militärmuseum Full.

References 

 Kurt Sahli, Jo Wiedmer: Saurer. Nutzfahrzeuge damals und heute. Buri, Bern 1983, .
militärfahrzeuge.ch Technical infos in German
Dump Trucks SJH-All Plant Group Ltd
Fahrzeuge der Schweizer Armee by Markus Hofmann (2000)

External links

  Berna 2VM

Military trucks of Switzerland
Off-road vehicles